The men's 400 metres event  at the 1996 European Athletics Indoor Championships was held in Stockholm Globe Arena on 8–9 March.

Medalists

Results

Heats
The first 2 from each heat (Q) and the next 2 fastest (q) qualified for the semifinals.

Semifinals
The winner of each semifinal (Q) and the next 1 fastest (q) qualified for the final. The subsequent 4 fastest qualified for the B final.

Final

B final

References

400 metres at the European Athletics Indoor Championships
400